Levi Stanley (1818? – 3 December 1908) and Matilda Joles Stanley (1821? – 15 January 1878) were part of a larger family of Romani immigrants from England to Montgomery County, Ohio. The Stanley family was referred to as "Dayton's own Gypsies," using the outdated moniker for those of Romani heritage. After the death of his parents, Levi and Matilda became known as "king" and "queen," or heads, of the extended family group. .

Biography

Family and migration
Levi was the son of Owen Stanley (1794 – 21 February 1860) and Harriet Worden (1793 – 30 August 1857), who preceded as King and Queen. Matilda was the daughter of Ephraim Joles. Levi had a brother named Benjamin who decided to settle down in New England. Benjamin was disowned by his father and was said to have had a curse put on him and the next three generations to follow. When Levi became infirm in old age, his son Levi Jr. "Sugar" Stanley (1835 – 5 March 1916) succeeded as King.

Born in Reading, Berkshire, England, Levi and Matilda and their families claimed to have come to the United States in 1856—"when Buchanan was king," as they put it—along with others of their people. A passenger list has Levi and his brother Benjamin arriving with their families on July 1, 1854, in New York City on a ship named "Try" that sailed from Glasgow, Scotland. They soon settled near Troy, Ohio. Shortly after they selected Dayton, Ohio as their headquarters for the summer months, it became the centre for the Gypsies of the country. Each year as they departed Dayton for warmer climes, their caravans would go in procession down Main Street.

Birth dates
In the federal censuses from 1860 to 1900, ages were enumerated that indicated various birth years, so the accuracy is in doubt; those given above are from their graves. In 1900, Levi gave his birth as November 1808. In his obituary, his age was given as 96 (implying 1812).

Occupation and personality
Defined originally as "wanderers," in later years they gave their occupation as horse traders. After Matilda’s death, Levi stated that "our children are all learning fast, and soon our people will not go a-roaming any more." The children of Levi’s extended family revealed the extent of their wandering by their birthplaces in the censuses:  New York, Illinois, Mississippi, Tennessee, Arkansas, Ohio, Michigan and others.

Contrary to common perception, they were reverent church people, and the reigning King and his son and heir, known as Sugar Stanley, were members in good standing of the Independent Order of Odd Fellows.

Matilda was said to have a wonderful faculty for telling fortunes and remarkable powers as a mesmerist, both qualities being explained by the assertion that they were handed down to her as the eldest daughter in the Stanley family, and were secrets possessed by her alone. She was described in the press as a "plain, hardy-looking woman, with a touch of Meg Merrilies in her appearance, and a manner indicative of a strong and pronounced character."  Meg Merrilies was a gypsy queen in the Sir Walter Scott novel, Guy Mannering, made famous on the American stage by Charlotte Cushman.

Death and legacy
The Gypsy Queen, Matilda Stanley, died in Vicksburg, Mississippi in January 1878 after an illness of two years, and her body was embalmed so that it was said to "retain the natural aspect of life."  It was placed in the Woodland receiving vault in Dayton, and everyday members of the late Queen's family came with fresh flowers to strew over her. Eight months later her funeral was held, giving time for word to spread and her people to travel to Dayton, and she was interred in the Stanley family plot. Twenty-thousand paid their last tribute to the dead Queen, including a dozen chiefs and their tribes from different sections of the United States, Canada and England.

Popular expectation that the funeral would consist of some extraordinary rites was not warranted. Rev. Dr. Daniel Berger, of the United Brethren Church of Dayton officiated, the quartet choir of the First United Brethren Church sang hymns, and the transfer of the casket from the vault to the family mausoleum was a brief ceremony.

Her funeral attracted press coverage by the major newspapers of the country and was front-page news. Four years later, two more children were interred, and the Dayton Democrat reported that the "attendance was quite large, tent-dwellers having come from all parts of the country – from New York to Mississippi – to be present at the funeral."  The story was picked up by the New York Times as well.

Yet, by the time King Levi Stanley died in Marshall, Texas thirty years later, the national press did not even mention his passing. In the article on the arrival of his remains in Dayton by train, it was noted that the aggregate wealth of his family was in the hundreds of thousands of dollars, made equally from horse trading and fortune telling. By then, the family owned substantial tracts of real estate, mainly in the north Dayton area. In the tradition of the family, the burial was made the following spring, and was attended by only thirty members of the family from around the country.

More than fifty members of the extended Stanley clan—including members of the Harrison, Jeffry, Young, Broadway and Joles families—are interred in the family plot at Woodland Cemetery, Dayton, Ohio. Thus, Woodland has three Kings and two Queens of the Gypsies buried there. The vault of Levi and Matilda is a box made of stone slabs, 2 feet deep and 10 by 4 feet in dimension.  Over the grave is a 20-foot column surmounted by an angel in white marble.

References 

Bryer, Thomas. Brothers Of The Wind The Saga Of An Angloromani Family, Greyforest Press 2018  (based on the Dayton Stanley Family)
"Death of a Gypsy King." Daily Gazette & Comet (Baton Rouge, LA), 15 March 1860, page 3, column 1.
"Burial of a Gypsy Queen. Interest Attaching to the Approaching Interment of Queen Matilda at Dayton."  New York Times, 7 August 1878, page 3.  (From the Dayton Democrat, 3 August 1878.)
"Burial of a Gypsy Queen.  Twenty Thousand Persons Present—The Services—Character And History of the Gypsies." New York Times, 16 September 1878, page 1.
"Notable Gypsy Burial." New York Times, 22 April 1882, page 4.
History of Dayton and Montgomery County, Ohio. Chicago: W. H. Beers & Co. 1882.
"Body of Gypsy King Placed in Vault." Dayton Daily News, 7 December 1908.
"Laid Away Just Like an Ordinary Mortal."  Dayton Daily News, 13 April 1909.

1818 births
1908 deaths
Stanley, Matilda
Stanley, Matilda
English Romani people
Burials at Woodland Cemetery and Arboretum
Married couples
English expatriates in the United States
People from Reading, Berkshire
Romani in the United States
Members of the Odd Fellows